Tumor necrosis factor ligand superfamily member 18 is a protein that in humans is encoded by the TNFSF18 gene.

The protein encoded by this gene is a cytokine that belongs to the tumor necrosis factor (TNF) ligand family. This cytokine is a ligand for receptor TNFRSF18/AITR/GITR. It has been shown to modulate T lymphocyte survival in peripheral tissues. This cytokine is also found to be expressed in endothelial cells, and is thought to be important for interaction between T lymphocytes and endothelial cells.

References

Further reading